Vasilios Samaras (born 16 February 1974) is a Greek retired football midfielder.

Career
Born in Aridaia, Samaras began playing football with local side Almopos F.C. He signed for Panachaiki in July 1995, and appeared in 94 Alpha Ethniki matches for the club in four seasons. Brief stints in the Alpha Ethniki followed with PAOK, Athinaikos and Proodeftiki. He also played for Almopos, Larissa, Kavala, Thrasyvoulos and Makedonikos in the Greek Beta Ethniki and Gamma Ethniki.

References

External links
Profile at Onsports.gr

1974 births
Living people
Greek footballers
Greek expatriate footballers
Super League Greece players
Football League (Greece) players
Cypriot First Division players
Panachaiki F.C. players
PAOK FC players
Athlitiki Enosi Larissa F.C. players
Kavala F.C. players
Athinaikos F.C. players
A.O. Kerkyra players
Proodeftiki F.C. players
Veria F.C. players
Thrasyvoulos F.C. players
Niki Volos F.C. players
AEP Paphos FC players
Expatriate footballers in Cyprus
Association football midfielders
Footballers from Aridaia